The following is a list of notable deaths in March 1998.

Entries for each day are listed alphabetically by surname. A typical entry lists information in the following sequence:
 Name, age, country of citizenship at birth, subsequent country of citizenship (if applicable), reason for notability, cause of death (if known), and reference.

March 1998

1
Jean Marie Balland, 63, French Roman Catholic cardinal, lung cancer.
Miltiades Caridis, 74, German-Greek conductor, stroke.
Archie Goodwin, 60, American comic book writer and artist (Luke Cage, Spider-Man, Star Wars), cancer.
Manolis Hatzidakis, 89, Greek art historian and Byzantinist.
Alexander Puzanov, 91, Soviet and Russian ambassador and statesman.
Sabina Sesselmann, 61, German film actress.
Garner E. Shriver, 85, American politician.
Robert Symonette, 73, Bahamian yachtsman and politician.

2
Leif Blomberg, 57, Swedish  politician.
Lucien Bodard, 84, French writer and journalist.
Slick Castleman, 84, American Major League Baseball player.
Henry Steele Commager, 95, American historian, pneumonia.
Maamun al-Kuzbari, Syrian politician and literary personality.
Darcy O'Brien, 58, American author and literary critic, heart attack.
Herbie Seneviratne, 72, Sri Lankan actor and filmmaker.
Marzette Watts, 59, American jazz tenor and soprano saxophonist.

3
Janet Burston, 63, American child actress, cancer.
Giuseppe Caron, 94, American politician.
Fred W. Friendly, 82, American television journalist and executive, stroke.
Edward Luckhoo, 85, Guyanese Governor General.
Hedley Mattingly, 82, British actor, cancer.
Charles Franklin Phillips, 87, American economist.
Marc Sautet, 51, French writer, translator, and philosopher, brain cancer.

4
Antonio Alsúa Alonso, 78, Spanish football player.
Betty Bird, 96, Austrian actress.
Jim Cullom, 72, American gridiron football player (New York Yanks).
Ivan Dougherty, 90, Australian Army officer.
Van Edmondson, 98, American football player.
Jules Fontaine Sambwa, 57, Zairean and Congolese politician and economist.

5
Donald James Cannon, 78, American politician.
Carleton Putnam, 96, American businessman, writer and segregationist, pneumonia.
Jerome Walters, 67, American middle distance runner and Olympian.
Donald Woods, 91, Canadian-American actor.

6
John Allin, 76, American Anglican bishop.
Rue Barclay, 76, American Country & Western musician.
Frank Barrett, 84, American baseball player
Benjamin Bowden, 91, British industrial designer.
Joe Shear, 54, American stock car racing driver, cancer.
Vanna Vanni, 83, Italian film actress.

7
Ziad Rafiq Beydoun, Lebanese petroleum geologist.
Bill Cable, 51, American actor, model and stunt performer, motorcycle accident.
Josep Escolà, 83, Spanish footballer.
Karen Holtsmark, 90, Norwegian painter.
Adem Jashari, 42, Kosovo Albanian militant separatist, murdered.
Hamëz Jashari, 48, Kosovar Albanian nationalist and guerilla, killed in action.
Don Kirkham, 90, American physicists and soil scientist.
Jack Perkins, 76, American film actor.
Leonie Rysanek, 71, Austrian dramatic soprano, bone cancer.
Wanda Tettoni, 87, Italian actress and voice actress.

8
Laurie Beechman, 44, American actress and singer, cancer.
Alexandre Gemignani, 72, Brazilian basketball player.
James Haggarty, 83, Canadian ice hockey player.
Jack Donaldson, Baron Donaldson of Kingsbridge, 90, British politician and public servant.
Jack McQuillan, 77, Irish politician, trade unionist and army officer.
Peter Nilson, 60, Swedish astronomer and novelist.
Ray Nitschke, 61, American football player (Green Bay Packers) and member of the Pro Football Hall of Fame, heart attack.
Susanne Ussing, 57, Danish artist, architect and ceramicist.

9
David MacAdam, 87, American physicist and color scientist.
Anna Maria Ortese, 83, Italian novelist, poet, and travel writer.
Colin Patterson, 64, British palaeontologist, heart attack.
Ulrich Schamoni, 58, German film director, screenwriter, actor and media proprietor, cancer.

10
C. E. Beeby, 95, New Zealand educationalist and psychologist.
Ilse Bing, 98, German photographer.
Lloyd Bridges, 85, American actor (Airplane!, Sea Hunt, Hot Shots!).
Karekin II Kazanjian, 70, Armenian Patriarch of Constantinople, liver cancer.
Hayim David HaLevi, 74, Israeli rabbi.
Milton Mallawarachchi, 52, Sri Lankan singer and musician.
Alberto Morrocco, 80, Scottish artist.
Richard Plant, 87, German-American historian, Holocaust scholar and writer.
Kenkō Satoshi, 30, Japanese Sumo wrestler, pulmonary embolism.

11
Basil Coetzee, 54, South African musician, cancer.
Buddy Jeannette, 80, American basketball player and coach, stroke.
José Laurel, Jr., 85, Filipino politician, pneumonia.
Manuel Piñeiro Losada, 64, Cuban revolutionary, politician and spymaster, traffic collision.
Sachio Sakai, 72, Japanese actor.
Nino Konis Santana, 41, East Timorese freedom fighter, killed in action.
Jean Shiley, 86, American high jumper and Olympian.
Koos Verdam, 83, Dutch politician.

12
Ovid Demaris, 78, American writer and journalist.
Karrell Fox, 70, American magician and television performer.
Jozef Kroner, 73, Slovak actor (The Shop on Main Street).
Red Richards, 85, American jazz pianist.
Kate Ross, 41, American mystery author, breast cancer.
Beatrice Wood, 105, American artist and ceramicist.

13
Judge Dread, 52, English musician, heart attack.
Peter Feller, 78, American theatrical set builder.
Philip Gale, 19, American Internet software pioneer and computer prodigy, suicide.
Claudio Gora, 84, Italian actor and film director.
Dave Lewis, 59, American rock and R&B musician, cancer.
Bill Reid, 78, Canadian artist, Parkinson's disease.
Risen Star, 12, American thoroughbred racehorse.
Anne Sayre, 74, American writer.
Peter Sillett, 65, England footballer, cancer.
Kōshō Uchiyama, 86, Japanese buddhist monk and origami master.
Frano Vodopivec, 73, Croatian cinematographer.
Hans von Ohain, 86, German physicist and jet engine designer, thyroiditis.
Ma Yueliang, 96, Chinese martial artist.

14
Abdul Rahman al-Iryani, 87, President of the Yemen Arab Republic.
Ed Boell, 81, American football player, coach, and official.
Hugh Coveney, 62, Irish politician, fall.
Dada Kondke, 65, Indian actor and film producer.
Dave Minor, 76, American basketball player.
Leo Sotorník, 71, Czech gymnast and Olympian.

15
Malati Choudhury, 93, Indian civil rights and freedom activist.
Tim Maia, 55, Brazilian musician and songwriter, cardiovascular disease.
Maud Mannoni, 74, Belgian-French psychoanalyst.
Dušan Pašek, 37, Slovak ice hockey player, suicide by gunshot.
Jheri Redding, 91, American hairdresser and businessman.
Carolyn Schnurer, 90, American fashion designer and sportswear pioneer.
Benjamin Spock, 94, American pediatrician and author.
Gennady Yevryuzhikhin, 54, Russian football player.

16
Derek Barton, 79, British chemist, Nobel Prize laureate.
Pertev Naili Boratav, 90, Turkish folklorist.
Esther Bubley, 77, American photographer, cancer.
Lydia Délrctorsckaya, 87, Russian-French refugee and model.
Noel Stephen Paynter, 99, British chief intelligence officer of Bomber Command during World War II.

17
Cliff Barker, 77, American basketball player.
Alain Bosquet, 78, French poet.
Milo Candini, 80, American baseball player.
Douglas Harold Copp, 83, Canadian scientist.
Bernarr Rainbow, 83, British historian of music education, and choir master.
Reza Sadeghi, 20, Iranian mathematician.
Helen Westcott, 70, American actor and former child actor, cancer.
Dorothy Weston, 98, Australian tennis player.

18
Siegfried Franz, 84, German composer of film and television scores.
Joan Freeman, 80, Australian physicist.
Ted Jolliffe, 89, Canadian politician.
Klaus Mollenhauer, 69, German pedagogical theorist.
Hideo Shima, 96, Japanese engineer and bullet train pioneer.
Dwight Sloan, 83, American gridiron football player.
Robert E. Woodside, 93, American politician and judge.

19
Simon Diedong Dombo, Ghanaian politician and king.
Samuel Dzhundrin, 77, Bulgarian Roman Catholic prelate and monk.
Klaus Havenstein, 75, German actor, cabaret artist, and television presenter.
E. M. S. Namboodiripad, 88, Indian communist politician and theorist.
Jimmy Scoular, 73, Scottish football player and manager.
Hanzade Sultan, 74, Ottoman princess and Turkish expatriate.

20
B. N. Adarkar, 87, Indian economist.
Yemima Avidar-Tchernovitz, 88, Israeli author.
Beverley Cross, 66, English playwright, librettist and screenwriter (Clash of the Titans, Jason and the Argonauts).
Anthony Fell, 83, British politician.
Agustín Gómez-Arcos, 65, Spanish writer, cancer.
George Howard, 41, American jazz saxophonist, colon cancer.
Laddie Lucas, 82, British Air Force officer and politician.
Catherine Sauvage, 68, French singer and actress.
Ivor Slaney, 76, Musical composer and conductor.
Maciej Słomczyński, 75, Polish translator and writer.

21
Ben Bagley, 64, American record producer and musical producer.
Horst Korsching, 85, German physicist.
Ramanathapuram C S Murugabhoopathy, 84, Indian Mridanga maestro.
Maciej Słomczyński, 75, Polish writer and translator.
Galina Ulanova, 88, Russian ballet dancer.

22
Simon Wingfield Digby, 88, British politician.
Jack R. Howard, 87, American broadcasting executive.
John Richard Keating, 63, American prelate of the Roman Catholic Church.
Shoichi Nishimura, Japanese football player and manager, pneumonia.
Rube Reiswerg, 85, American basketball player.

23
Louis Arbessier, 90, French actor.
Chuck Hunsinger, 72, American gridiron football player.
Hilda Morley, 81, American poet.
Ray Scott, 78, American sportscaster.
Gerald Stano, 46, American serial killer, execution by electric chair.
Marie-Laure Tardieu-Blot, 95, French botanist  and pteridologist.

24
Åke Mangård, 81, Swedish Air Force major general.
António Ribeiro, 69, Portuguese Cardinal of the Roman Catholic Church, cancer.
Torben Tryde, 81, Danish writer, Olympian and resistance fighter during World War II.
Jill Ann Weatherwax, 27, American model and aspiring singer, homicide.

25
Daniel Massey, 64, English actor and performer, Hodgkin's lymphoma.
Clive Osborne, 75, Australian politician.
Asha Posley, 71, Pakistani actress.
Micheál Prendergast, 77, Irish farmer, businessman and politician.
Steven Schiff, 51, American politician, squamous-cell carcinoma, skin cancer.
Chris Trickle, 24, American stock car racing driver, drive-by shooting.
Wilfred Watson, 86, Canadian professor and author.
Betsey Cushing Roosevelt Whitney, 88, American philanthropist.

26
Denis Charles, 64, American jazz drummer, pneumonia.
Shantinath Desai, 69, Indian author.
Nikolay Dubinin, 91, Soviet and Russian biologist and academician.
Arthur S. Link, 77, American historian and educator, lung cancer.
Kate Cruise O'Brien, 49, Irish writer.

27
Nadija Hordijenko Andrianova, 76, Ukrainian writer and translator of the language Esperanto.
Julio César Britos, 71, Uruguayan football player.
John William Comber, 92, American Catholic missionary and bishop.
Joan Lestor, Baroness Lestor of Eccles, 66, British politician, ALS.
Chen Jin, 90, Taiwanese painter.
Aghajani Kashmeri, 89, Indian screenwriter, actor and Urdu poet.
Joan Maynard, 76, English politician and trade unionist, cancer.
David McClelland, 80, American psychologist.
Steve Nemeth, 75, American gridiron football player.
Ferdinand Anton Ernst Porsche, 88, Austrian auto designer and businessman.
Otto Freiherr von Feury, 91, MGerman politician.
Karl-Adolf Zenker, 90, German officer in the Kriegsmarine during World War II.

28
Else Elster, 88, German actress.
Albert Levan, 93, Swedish botanist and geneticist.
David Powers, 85, Special Assistant and secretary to John F. Kennedy.
Larry Stephens, 59, American gridiron football player (Cleveland Browns, Los Angeles Rams, Dallas Cowboys).

29
Giuliano Biagetti, 72, Italian film director and screenwriter.
Kvitka Cisyk, 44, American coloratura soprano, breast cancer.
David Nightingale Hicks, 69, English interior decorator and designer, lung cancer.
Loreta, Iranian Armenian actress.
Dick Phillips, 66, American baseball player, manager and coach.
Eugene Walter, 76, American screenwriter, poet, actor, puppeteer and chef, liver cancer.
Harold E. Wilson, 76, United States Marine and recipient of the Medal of Honor.
Dudley Wysong, 58, American golfer, aneurysm.

30
Ramsay Ames, 79, 1940s American B movie actress, model, pin-up girl and television host, lung cancer.
Michèle Arnaud, 79, French singer and director.
Judy Buenoano, 54, American convicted murderer, execution by electric chair.
Max Cosyns, 91, Belgian physicist, inventor and explorer.
Massimo Franciosa, 73, Italian screenwriter and film director.
Frank King, 79, British Army officer.
Mordechai Olmert, 90, Israeli politician.
Athelstan Spilhaus, 86, South African-American geophysicist and oceanographer.

31
Bella Abzug, 77, American lawyer, politician and social activist.
John H. Cooke, 86, American lawyer and politician.
Tim Flock, 73, American racecar driver and member of the NASCAR Hall of Fame, liver and throat cancer.
Henry George Glyde, 91, Canadian painter.
Blanche Montel, 95, French actress.
Joel Ryce-Menuhin, 64, American pianist, cancer.
Pete Tillman, 75, American football player and coach.

References 

1998-03
 03